Christopher or Chris James may refer to:

 Christopher James, 5th Baron Northbourne (1927–2019), British farmer and businessman
 Chris James (baseball) (born 1962), American baseball player
 Chris James (audio engineer) (born 1974), American musician, producer, and sound engineer
 Christopher James (poet) (born 1975), British poet
 Chris James (racing driver) (born 1978), British auto racing driver and businessman
 Chris James (footballer) (born 1987), New Zealand soccer player
 Chris James (referee), Australian rugby league referee
 Chris James (Big Brother) (born 2000), reality television programme participant
 Chris James, singer on "The Veldt", a song by electronic music producer deadmau5